Merrill Hills is a hamlet in Saskatchewan. It was named for Merrill, Wisconsin.

References

Corman Park No. 344, Saskatchewan
Organized hamlets in Saskatchewan